The Akaflieg Berlin B4 F.F. was a single-seat aircraft built in Germany in the early 1930s. It was a high-wing monoplane of all-wood construction with fabric-covered foldable wings

Design and development
In 1931 the Deutsche Luftfahrt-Verband e.V. (DLV) opened a competition for an inexpensive light aircraft. Two entries were put forward; Akaflieg Berlin's B4 F.F. (D-2229) and Dipl.-Ing. Hermann Mayer's MM-1 (D-2230), with both aircraft exhibited at the 1932 Deutschen Luftsport-Ausstellung (DELA) in Berlin.

Like the Mayer MM-1 the B4 F.F. was constructed at the DLV workshops in Adlershof. Design took eight months and construction a further nine.

Specifications (B4 F.F.)

References

Tractor aircraft
Aircraft first flown in 1931
1930s German aircraft
High-wing aircraft
Akaflieg Berlin aircraft